A trefoil is a graphic form composed of the outline of three overlapping rings, used in architecture and Christian symbolism, among other areas. The term is also applied to other symbols with a threefold shape. A similar shape with four rings is called a quatrefoil.

Architecture

Ornamentation
'Trefoil' is a term in Gothic architecture given to the ornamental foliation or cusping introduced in the heads of window-lights, tracery, and panellings, in which the centre takes the form of a three-lobed leaf (formed from three partially overlapping circles). One of the earliest examples is in the plate tracery at Winchester Cathedral (1222–1235). The fourfold version of an architectural trefoil is a quatrefoil.

A simple trefoil shape in itself can be symbolic of the Trinity, while a trefoil combined with an equilateral triangle was also a moderately common symbol of the Christian Trinity during the late Middle Ages in some parts of Europe, similar to a barbed quatrefoil. Two forms of a trefoil combined with a triangle are shown below:

A dove, which symbolizes the Holy Spirit, is sometimes depicted within the outlined form of the trefoil combined with a triangle.

Architectural layout
In architecture and archaeology, a 'trefoil' describes a layout or floor plan consisting of three apses in clover-leaf shape, as for example in the Megalithic temples of Malta.

Particularly in church architecture, such a layout may be called a "triconchos".

Heraldry
The heraldic 'trefoil' is a stylized clover. It should not be confused with the figure named in French heraldry  ("threefoil"), which is a stylized flower with three petals, and differs from the heraldic trefoil in being not slipped.

Symbols
Symmetrical trefoils are particularly popular as warning and informational symbols. If a box containing hazardous material is moved around and shifted into different positions, it is still easy to recognize the symbol, while the distinctive trefoil design of the recycling symbol makes it easy for a consumer to notice and identify the packaging the symbol has been printed on as recyclable. Easily stenciled symbols are also favored.

While the green trefoil is considered by many to be the symbol of Ireland, the harp has much greater officially recognized status. Therefore, shamrocks generally do not appear on Irish coins or postage stamps.

A trefoil is also part of the logo for Adidas Originals, which also includes three stripes.

See also
Fleur-de-Lys
Foil (architecture)
Shamrock
Trefoil domain
Trefoil arch
Trefoil knot
Torus knot
Quatrefoil

Notes

References

External links

Explanation of Christian symbolism of Trefoil

Ornaments
Christian symbols
Symbols
Heraldic charges
Visual motifs
Piecewise-circular curves